Zodiac is a two-masted schooner designed by William H. Hand, Jr. for Robert Wood Johnson and J. Seward Johnson, heirs to the Johnson & Johnson pharmaceuticals fortune. Hand intended to epitomize the best features of the American fishing schooner. The  (sparred length;  on deck), 145-ton vessel competed in transatlantic races. In 1931 the vessel was purchased by the  San Francisco Bar Pilots Association, brought from the Atlantic, modified and placed in service as the pilot vessel California serving as such until retired in 1972.

Design and construction
The schooner was the largest vessel designed by William H. Hand, Jr., a renowned naval architect, who was a primary developer of the V-bottomed hull motorsailers.  Zodiac was built in 1924 at the Hodgdon Brothers Shipyard, East Boothbay, Maine.

Yacht
Robert Hood and J. Seward Johnson sailed the yacht as far north as Nachvak, Labrador and in 1928 entered Zodiac in a race from New York to Spain with the yacht finishing fourth among the large yachts.

Pilot vessel California
The San Francisco Bar Pilots Association bought the schooner in 1931 on the Atlantic Coast and brought the vessel to San Francisco for modification and operation as the pilot vessel California bearing the name of an earlier vessel of the Association. The vessel was the largest schooner operated by the San Francisco Bar Pilots who operated her in peacetime and through wars until 1972 as the last sailing vessel in the United States to serve as a pilot vessel.

Modification
As a pilot boat is required to be on station during all weather and, in the case of the San Francisco Bar Pilots of the time, remain on station for about five days supporting a crew of seven hosting up to ten pilots, modification was required. The Association had the vessel modified by The Moore Dry Dock Company of Oakland, after consultation with the original designer, increased power with a  Atlas-Imperial diesel engine to replace the original Atlas  diesel engine that in turn required modifications to the stern to accommodate a larger shaft and  diameter propeller with  pitch replacing the original  diameter, 2-bladed propeller. Deck houses and accommodations were renovated to fit the needs of pilots serving long waits on station with a pilot house added that was unusual for a yacht and resembling that of a commercial vessel. The galley had an Ingle oil burner range and accommodations were heated by a steam heat system based on an Areola boiler.

Pilot service
California was delivered and on station in early 1932 serving as one of the pilot boats, rotating duty on the bar at five-day intervals. The other active pilot vessel was Gracie S. with Adventuress serving as backup vessel. The offshore pilot vessel station was approximately nine miles off the Golden Gate.  Operating in close proximity with large ships had its risks with California losing her bow three times and once being grounded in San Francisco Bay.

California was retired in 1972 to be replaced by pure motorized vessels, including a more modern vessel built in 2000. This made her one of the last three sail-powered pilot vessels in the United States, along with the Boston-based schooner Roseway, which was retired sometime between 1971 and 1973, and Adventuress, also once a San Francisco pilot boat, which was retired in 1952, and is also a registered National Historic Landmark.

Sale and return to Zodiac
California was sold in 1973 returning to  the name Zodiac and, in the late 1970s, the private Vessel Zodiac Corporation was formed to operate and maintain her. She was professionally restored, and her rig, which had been altered during her time as a pilot boat, was returned to its original configuration. Zodiac now operates charters and cruises in Washington state's San Juan Islands and British Columbia's Gulf Islands. The not-for-profit Northwest Schooner Society partners with the corporation to provide sail training programs for youth and adults.

See also

Historic preservation
National Register of Historic Places
List of schooners

Footnotes

References

External links

Vessel Zodiac Corporation
Northwest Schooner Society
NW Windjammer Fleet
San Francisco Bar Pilots—What We Do

Schooners of the United States
Transportation in the San Francisco Bay Area
History of San Francisco
Museums in Seattle
National Register of Historic Places in Seattle
Two-masted ships
Ships on the National Register of Historic Places in Washington (state)
Museum ships in Washington (state)
1924 ships